is Japanese beauty pageant. In the past 57 competitions, the total number of applications is 118,794 people and the Grand Prix is 55 people. It started in 1950 by the Yomiuri Shimbun and is held every year by the "Miss Nippon Association".

History

In 1945, after the end of World War II, Japan entered a difficult era of reconstruction. Relief supplies "LARA supplies" sent from the United States saved Japanese children suffering from malnutrition. An urgent resolution of appreciation was adopted at the plenary session of members of the House of Representatives in 1947 for this act.

In 1950,  a female goodwill ambassador was sent to thank the American people. The "Miss Nippon Contest" was held to select goodwill ambassadors. Fujiko Yamamoto, who later became one of Japan's leading movie actresses, won the first Miss Nippon.

After that, there was a time of interruption, and in 1968 it was the Wada Laboratory (formerly Wada Milk), a beauty research group represented by Shizuo Wada, who advocated and practiced the Wada-style figure ring method as slimming health beauty. It was. At that time, Shizuo Wada was also in the limelight as a leader of television calisthenics.

"Miss Nippon" visited countries around the world with the letter of former Prime Minister Nobusuke Kishi and helped pave the way for the success of the Expo '70.

Wada Laboratory (Wada Shoji Co., Ltd.), which hosted the first revival tournament in 1968 to the 49th tournament in 2017, was formed on July 1, 2017, with the aim of further developing Miss Nippon. The hosting of the Miss Nippon Contest and the management of Miss Nippon were transferred to the Miss Nippon Association, and the philosophy was inherited.

Meanwhile, Yuko Wada of Miss Nippon (later married to Kaoru, the second son of Shizuo) from 1995 to 1979 became the chairman of the Miss Nippon Contest.

In 2019, in commemoration of the 50th anniversary of Miss Nippon's resurrection, "50 Years of Japanese Beauty, Showa, Heisei, and New Age Beauty" was released.

Ai Wada, who has been the "Miss Nippon Chief Manager" since August 1, 2020, has been appointed as the "Miss Nippon Contest Tournament chairman". Kentaro Wada is appointed as "Miss Nippon Contest Secretariat Representative". A new system by brothers and sisters has started.

Eligibility for application 
Participants are open to the public, and anyone who meets the following conditions can apply (as of 2021).
Having Japanese nationality
Being unmarried

Selection method 
Applicants who pass the document screening participate in any of the regional competitions held in several locations nationwide. Participants selected as "finalists" at the district tournament advance to the finals of the Miss Nippon Contest, and the winners of the Miss Nippon Grand Prix and others are decided in the end.

As with many modern Miss Contests, the criteria for selection are not limited to appearance, but the Japanese national team will be selected based on the world competition to be held at a later date, such as "Miss Universe Japan". Unlike the contest, Miss Nippon's basic policy is to select "the highest level of Japanese beauty that is completed in Japan." In particular, in the internal examination, "education" and "feeling" are emphasized.

Award

Miss Nippon Grand Prix
 "The highest level of beauty of Japanese women" that represents the year and is full of young and beautiful possibilities
Miss Nippon Miss Kimono (from the first resurrection)
 Play a role in conveying the beauty of Japan in the world by pretending to be the traditional beauty of Japan
Miss Nippon "Marine Day" (newly established in 1996)
 Thank you for the blessings of the sea that are indispensable to Japan, an island country, and play a role in raising understanding and interest in the marine industry.
Miss Nippon "Water for Life" (newly established in 2012)
 "Water public relations officer" who widely conveys Japan's excellent water cycle and the hearts and skills of the people who support it
Miss Nippon Greenery for Life (newly established in 2015)
 Thank the ancestors who have protected and nurtured the abundant greenery that will lead to the future, and play a role in spreading familiarity with greenery and forests.
Miss Nippon Miss Sports (new in 2019)
 Encourage physical and mental training and play a role in spreading the joy of taking on healthy challenges
Semi-Miss Nippon
 Semi-Miss Nippon in the Miss Nippon Contest is treated as the second prize after Miss Nippon, which is selected more than once. In other words, the order is Miss Nippon Grand Prix> Miss Nippon Awards> Semi-Miss Nippon.
Shizuo Wada Special Award Miss Nippon (newly established in 2015)
 Until now, Miss Nippon has been selected by open recruitment, but Shizuo Wada, the founder of Wada Laboratory (1922–2006), worked hard to revive Miss Nippon and laid the foundation for Japan's diet. To those who have already shown remarkable performance and cannot easily enter the contest in a busy position, with the idea of "giving honor and profit to beautiful women" in honor of Shizuo's achievements. This is a celebrity special award to commend a woman with great potential as Miss Nippon from the desire to support women with wonderful qualities of beauty and health, regardless of whether or not they have. Judging is a collegial recommendation system by the contest secretariat with four disciples who supported Miss Nippon together with Shizuo. As of 2021, only three people, Airi Hatakeyama and Marin Minamiya and Kiyou Shimizu, received this recommendation award.
 In the past, Miss Elegant, Miss Venus, Miss Nippon "Photogenic", Miss Nippon "Sky Day", Miss Nippon "International Friendship", Miss Nippon "Miss Swimsuit", Miss Nippon "Nature" (2003–2014) ) And other awards. In addition, there was a time when the contestants of the final tournament were also given the title of Miss Nippon. In fact, until the early 1990s, all the people who participated in the Grand Prix deciding tournament attended the Grand Prix deciding tournament with red and white letters and a sash that says "Miss Nippon" on the border. Currently, no sashes are hung during the judging of the final competition, but after the winners of each award are decided, the sashes on which the award-winning awards are written will be hung by the judges. At the official event of Miss Nippon attendance, we will attend with the award-winning tasuki.

Miss Nippon Grand Prix 

（※）Noriko Suzuki and Junko Kuwahara won the award for the second consecutive year.

Famous winners / contestants other than the Grand Prix 

History representative

TV Show 
 Ryutaro Ueoka is crazy! (TBS）
 The Wide (NTV)
 Sunday Jungle (TV Asahi)
 Pleasure MAP (TV Asahi)
 Mokuspe (NTV)
 Refreshing !! (NTV)
 Video Experience! Ikkimi Theater (KansaiTV)
 Dream Theater (FM Tokyo Tokyo Local)
 Solving your worries! After the rain Yorozu-do (YomiuriTV)
 What's wrong with me? (TBS)
 Akashiya pacific saury's career change DE vocation (NTV)

Movie 
 "Dream is the future you live in" (2018, Gachinko Film)
 Produced to commemorate the 50th anniversary of Miss Nippon's resurrection in 2018. In 2016, it was drawn in close contact with the 48th tournament contest and its winners, with interviews with related parties.

Books 
 "Miss Nippon Beauty Diet" (Nihon Bungeisha Yuko Wada << Miss Nippon Contest Tournament Steering Committee Chair >> October 2002) 
 "Miss Nippon-style diet that has been passed down for 50 years" (Sanctuary Publishing, Yuko Wada << Miss Nippon Contest Tournament Steering Committee chairman >> January 22, 2010) 
 "Until I'm a little nerdy with low communicative power until I become a quasi-miss Japan" (KADOKAWA << 2012 quasi-miss Japan award >> January 22, 2016) 
 "Miss Nippon Beauty Food" (Shogakukan Miss Nippon Contest Secretariat, Ai Wada << Miss Nippon Contest Tournament Steering Committee chairman >> co-authored January 24, 2017) 
 "50 Years of Japanese Beauty: What is the Beauty of the Showa, Heisei, and New Era?" (Modern Fire Department, Miss Nippon Association, January 17, 2019) 
 "Miss Nippon Revival 50th Anniversary Magazine" "Ai Wada Cover"

See also 
 Miss Nippon (Japanese)
 Miss Universe Japan
 Miss World Japan
 Miss International Japan
 Miss Earth Japan
 Japan Bishojo Contest

References

External links
 Official website
 Organizer group site
 
 
 
 Miss Nippon Contest – YouTube公式チャンネル

 
Recurring events established in 1950
Japanese popular culture
Beauty pageants in Japan
1950 establishments in Japan
Japanese awards